|}

The Pavilion Stakes is a Group 3 flat horse race in Great Britain open to horses aged three years only.
It is run at Ascot over a distance of 6 furlongs, and it is scheduled to take place each year in late April or early May.

The race was first run in 1999 and was awarded Group 3 status (from Listed) in 2015.  It is run on the same card as the Sagaro Stakes.

Since 2019 the official title has indicated that the race should be considered as a trial for the Commonwealth Stakes, run at the Royal Meeting over the same course and distance in June.

Winners

See also
 Horse racing in Great Britain
 List of British flat horse races

References
Racing Post:
, 
 ifhaonline.org – International Federation of Horseracing Authorities – Pavilion Stakes (2019).

Flat races in Great Britain
Ascot Racecourse
Flat horse races for three-year-olds
Recurring sporting events established in 1999
1999 establishments in England